Park Ju-Sung  (born 20 February 1984 in Jinhae, Gyeongsangnam-do) is a South Korean football player currently playing for Daejeon Citizen.

Club statistics

References

External links
 
 
 National Team Player Record 
 FIFA Player Statistics
 

1984 births
Living people
Association football defenders
South Korean footballers
South Korean expatriate footballers
South Korea international footballers
Suwon Samsung Bluewings players
Gimcheon Sangmu FC players
Vegalta Sendai players
Gyeongnam FC players
Beijing Renhe F.C. players
Chinese Super League players
K League 1 players
J1 League players
J2 League players
Expatriate footballers in Japan
South Korean expatriate sportspeople in Japan
Expatriate footballers in China
South Korean expatriate sportspeople in China
Daejeon Hana Citizen FC players
Sportspeople from South Gyeongsang Province